Brigitte Olive is a French former footballer who played as a forward for FCF Juvisy of the Division 1 Féminine. She is now president of the French National Olympic and Sports Committee. Olive succeeded Denis Masseglia. Her brother is Karl Olive.

International career

Olive represented France 32 times from  1988-1997 .

References

1971 births
Paris FC (women) players
ASJ Soyaux-Charente players
French women's footballers
Division 1 Féminine players
Women's association football midfielders
France women's international footballers
Women's association football managers
Knights of the Ordre national du Mérite
French sports executives and administrators
Living people